Jasminum tortuosum is a species of jasmine native to South Africa. It is generally found twining high into the trees of forests in southwestern part of Cape Province, but also may scramble where there is little vertical space. It has angular branches off its main stem, and its flowers usually have five white petals each. The specific epithet (tortuosum) is from Latin, describing something that is winding or very twisted.

Etymology
'Jasminum' is a Latinized form of the Arabic word, 'yasemin' for sweetly scented plants.

'Tortuosum' is the possessive form os 'tortus', meaning 'complex', 'meandering', or 'winding'; this is a reference to the twining of its stems.

Gallery

References

External links

 Leaves (1), from tropicos.org
 Leaves (2), from tropicos.org
 Old illustration by N.J. von Jacquin (1804), from plantillustrations.org

tortuosum
Plants described in 1804
Flora of South Africa